This is a list of career achievements by Alejandro Valverde, a Spanish professional racing cyclist who raced professionally between 2002 and 2022. Valverde is noted as a prolific winner of one-day races and stage races.

Valverde is a four-time National Champion (three road titles, one time trial title) and is also a Grand Tour victor, winning the 2009 Vuelta a España. He won a record seven medals in the men's road race at the UCI Road World Championships, winning the rainbow jersey in 2018.

Valverde also holds a number of records, notably the record for number of victories at La Flèche Wallonne, with five and the number of overall victories at the Vuelta a Andalucía with five. He achieved 133 victories as a professional rider, including 17 Grand Tour stage wins.

Major results
Source: 

1997
 2nd Time trial, National Junior Road Championships
1998
 2nd Time trial, National Junior Road Championships
2001
 1st  Road race, National Under-23 Road Championships
 3rd  Road race, Mediterranean Games
2002
 7th Circuito de Getxo
 8th Clásica de Almería
 9th Overall Clásica Internacional de Alcobendas
2003
 1st Klasika Primavera
 1st Prueba Villafranca de Ordizia
 1st Stage 3 Vuelta a Aragón
 2nd  Road race, UCI Road World Championships
 3rd Overall Vuelta a España
1st  Combination classification
1st Stages 9 & 15
Held  after Stage 20
 3rd Overall Vuelta a Andalucía
 3rd Overall Troféu Joaquim Agostinho
1st Stages 4a & 5
 3rd Trofeo Mallorca
 3rd Trofeo Luis Puig
 5th Overall Tour of the Basque Country
1st  Points classification
1st Stage 3
 5th Trofeo Calvia
 8th Trofeo Cala Bona-Cala Rajada
 8th Trofeo Manacor-Porto Cristo
2004
 1st  Overall Vuelta a Burgos
1st Stages 1, 2 & 3
 1st  Overall Volta a la Comunitat Valenciana
1st Stages 2 & 3
 1st  Overall Vuelta a Murcia
 1st Trofeo Cala Millor
 1st Klasika Primavera
 2nd Road race, National Road Championships
 2nd Trofeo Luis Puig
 4th Overall Vuelta a España
1st Stage 3
 4th Overall Vuelta a Castilla y León
1st Stages 3, 4 & 5
 4th Trofeo Calvia
 6th Road race, UCI Road World Championships
 6th Overall Tour of the Basque Country
1st  Points classification
1st Stage 1
 10th GP Miguel Induráin
2005
 1st Trofeo Manacor
 1st Trofeo Soller
 1st Stage 10 Tour de France
 Tour of the Basque Country
1st Stages 3 & 4
 2nd  Road race, UCI Road World Championships
 2nd Overall Paris–Nice
1st  Young rider classification
1st Stage 7
 2nd GP Miguel Induráin
 4th Trofeo Calvia
 10th Trofeo Alcudia
 10th Clásica a los Puertos de Guadarrama
2006
 1st UCI ProTour
 1st La Flèche Wallonne
 1st Liège–Bastogne–Liège
 2nd Overall Vuelta a España
1st Stage 7
 2nd Overall Tour of the Basque Country
1st  Points classification
1st Stage 1
 3rd  Road race, UCI Road World Championships
 3rd Overall Tour de Romandie
1st Stage 4
 4th Trofeo Sóller
 7th Overall Critérium du Dauphiné Libéré
 7th Overall Vuelta a Murcia
1st Stage 2
 7th Clásica de Almería
 8th Clásica de San Sebastián
2007
 1st  Overall Vuelta a Murcia
1st Stage 4 (ITT)
 1st  Overall Volta a la Comunitat Valenciana
 2nd Road race, National Road Championships
 2nd Overall Vuelta a Burgos
1st Stage 4 (ITT)
 2nd Liège–Bastogne–Liège
 2nd La Flèche Wallonne
 2nd Klasika Primavera
 2nd Clásica a los Puertos de Guadarrama
 3rd Overall Critérium International
1st  Points classification
 3rd Clásica de San Sebastián
 3rd GP Miguel Induráin
 5th Overall Tour of the Basque Country
 6th Overall Tour de France
 6th Amstel Gold Race
 8th Overall Clásica Internacional de Alcobendas
1st Stage 3 (ITT)
2008
 1st UCI ProTour
 1st  Road race, National Road Championships
 1st  Overall Critérium du Dauphiné Libéré
1st  Points classification
1st Stages 1 & 3 (ITT)
 1st  Overall Vuelta a Murcia
1st Stage 4 (ITT)
 1st Liège–Bastogne–Liège
 1st Clásica de San Sebastián
 1st Paris–Camembert
 2nd Klasika Primavera
 3rd Trofeo Calvia
 3rd Amstel Gold Race
 5th Overall Vuelta a España
1st Stage 2
 7th Overall Critérium International
 9th Overall Tour de France
1st Stages 1 & 6
Held  after Stages 1–2
Held  after Stage 1
2009
 1st  Overall Vuelta a España
1st  Combination classification
 1st  Overall Volta a Catalunya
1st Stage 3
 1st  Overall Critérium du Dauphiné Libéré
 1st  Overall Vuelta a Burgos
 1st Klasika Primavera
 2nd UCI World Ranking
 2nd Overall Vuelta a la Comunidad de Madrid
 3rd Road race, National Road Championships
 4th Overall Tour de Romandie
 7th La Flèche Wallonne
 9th Road race, UCI Road World Championships
 9th Overall Vuelta a Castilla y León
1st  Points classification
1st  Mountains classification
1st  Combination classification
1st Stages 3 & 5

2010
 1st  Overall Tour de Romandie
1st Stage 5
 1st  Overall Tour Méditerranéen
 2nd Overall Paris–Nice
 2nd Overall Tour of the Basque Country
1st  Points classification
1st Stages 1 & 2
 2nd GP Miguel Induráin
 3rd Liège–Bastogne–Liège
 8th La Flèche Wallonne

2012
 1st  Overall Vuelta a Andalucía
1st  Points classification
1st Stage 2
 1st Stage 17 Tour de France
 2nd Overall Vuelta a España
1st  Points classification
1st  Combination classification
1st Stages 1 (TTT), 3 & 8
 2nd Overall Tour Down Under
1st Stage 5
 2nd Klasika Primavera
 3rd  Road race, UCI Road World Championships
 3rd Overall Paris–Nice
1st Stage 3
 5th UCI World Tour
 9th Overall Tour de Suisse
2013
 1st  Overall Vuelta a Andalucía
1st  Points classification
1st Prologue & Stage 3
 1st Trofeo Serra de Tramuntana
 2nd Giro di Lombardia
 2nd Amstel Gold Race
 2nd Clásica de San Sebastián
 3rd UCI World Tour
 3rd  Road race, UCI Road World Championships
 3rd Overall Vuelta a España
1st  Points classification
 3rd Liège–Bastogne–Liège
 3rd Vuelta a Murcia
 4th GP Miguel Induráin
 6th Milano–Torino
 7th Overall Critérium du Dauphiné
 7th La Flèche Wallonne
 8th Overall Tour de France
 9th Overall Tour de Romandie
2014
 1st UCI World Tour
 National Road Championships
1st  Time trial
2nd Road race
 1st  Overall Vuelta a Andalucía
1st  Points classification
1st Combination classification
1st Prologue, Stages 1 & 2
 1st Vuelta a Murcia
 1st Roma Maxima
 1st GP Miguel Induráin
 1st La Flèche Wallonne
 1st Clásica de San Sebastián
 2nd Overall Route du Sud
 2nd Liège–Bastogne–Liège
 2nd Giro di Lombardia
 3rd  Road race, UCI Road World Championships
 3rd Overall Vuelta a España
1st Stages 1 (TTT) & 6
Held  after Stages 2, 6–8
Held  after Stage 15
Held  after Stages 6–17
 3rd Strade Bianche
 4th Overall Tour de France
 4th Amstel Gold Race
 5th Overall Tour of the Basque Country
2015
 1st UCI World Tour
 1st  Road race, National Road Championships
 1st Liège–Bastogne–Liège
 1st La Flèche Wallonne
 1st Trofeo Serra de Tramuntana
 2nd Overall Volta a Catalunya
1st Stages 2, 5 & 7
 2nd Amstel Gold Race
 2nd Trofeo Andratx–Mirador d'es Colomer
 3rd Overall Tour de France
 3rd Overall Tour of Oman
 3rd Clásica de San Sebastián
 3rd Strade Bianche
 4th Overall Dubai Tour
 4th Giro di Lombardia
 5th Road race, UCI Road World Championships
 5th GP Miguel Induráin
 6th Vuelta a La Rioja
 7th Overall Vuelta a España
1st  Points classification
1st Stage 4
 7th Overall Abu Dhabi Tour
 9th Overall Critérium du Dauphiné
2016
 1st  Overall Vuelta a Castilla y León
1st  Combination classification
1st  Points classification
1st Stages 2 & 3
 1st  Overall Vuelta a Andalucía
1st Stage 5
 1st La Flèche Wallonne
 2nd Vuelta a Murcia
 National Road Championships
3rd Time trial
4th Road race
 3rd Overall Giro d'Italia
1st Stage 16
 3rd Clásica de San Sebastián
 4th UCI World Tour
 4th Klasika Primavera
 5th Trofeo Serra de Tramuntana
 6th Overall Tour de France
 6th Giro di Lombardia
 8th Trofeo Pollenca–Port de Andratx
 10th Strade Bianche
 Vuelta a España
Held  after Stage 8
Held  after Stages 10–19
2017
 1st  Overall Volta a Catalunya
1st  Mountains classification
1st Stages 3, 5 & 7
 1st  Overall Tour of the Basque Country
1st  Points classification
1st Stage 5
 1st  Overall Vuelta a Andalucía
1st  Points classification
1st Stage 1
 1st Liège–Bastogne–Liège
 1st La Flèche Wallonne
 1st Vuelta a Murcia
 2nd Road race, National Road Championships
 2nd Trofeo Pollenca–Port de Andratx
 7th UCI World Tour
 9th Overall Critérium du Dauphiné
 9th Trofeo Serra de Tramuntana
2018
 1st  Road race, UCI Road World Championships
 1st  Overall Volta a Catalunya
1st  Mountains classification
1st Stages 2 & 4
 1st  Overall Route d'Occitanie
1st  Points classification
1st Stage 3
 1st  Overall Abu Dhabi Tour
1st Stage 5
 1st  Overall Volta a la Comunitat Valenciana
1st Stages 2 & 4
 1st GP Miguel Induráin
 National Road Championships
2nd Road race
4th Time trial
 2nd La Flèche Wallonne
 2nd Klasika Primavera
 2nd Vuelta a Murcia
 3rd UCI World Tour
 3rd Milano–Torino
 3rd Trofeo Serra de Tramuntana
 4th Trofeo Lloseta–Andratx
 4th Strade Bianche
 5th Overall Vuelta a España
1st  Points classification
1st Stages 2 & 8
Held  after Stages 5 & 7–18
 5th Amstel Gold Race
  Combativity award Stage 11 Tour de France
2019
 1st  Road race, National Road Championships
 1st  Overall Route d'Occitanie
1st Stage 1
 2nd Overall Vuelta a España
1st Stage 7
 2nd Overall UAE Tour
1st Stage 3
 2nd Overall Volta a la Comunitat Valenciana
 2nd Overall Vuelta a Murcia
 2nd Giro di Lombardia
 2nd Milano–Torino
 2nd Gran Premio Bruno Beghelli
 3rd Trofeo Serra de Tramuntana
 4th Trofeo Campos, Porreres, Felanitx, Ses Salines
 5th Giro dell'Emilia
 7th Milan–San Remo
 8th Tour of Flanders
 9th Overall Tour de France
 10th Overall Volta a Catalunya
 10th Clásica de San Sebastián
 10th Trofeo Andratx–Lloseta
2020
 2nd Trofeo Serra de Tramuntana
 8th Road race, UCI Road World Championships
 10th Overall Vuelta a España
 Combativity award Stage 7
 10th Overall Volta a la Comunitat Valenciana
 10th Pollença–Andratx
2021
 1st GP Miguel Induráin
 1st Stage 6 Critérium du Dauphiné
 2nd Overall Giro di Sicilia
1st Stage 3
 3rd La Flèche Wallonne
 4th Overall Volta a Catalunya
 4th Liège–Bastogne–Liège
 5th Giro di Lombardia
 5th Amstel Gold Race
 7th Overall Tour of the Basque Country
 8th GP Industria & Artigianato di Larciano
 9th Coppa Ugo Agostoni
 10th Milano–Torino
2022
 1st  Overall O Gran Camiño
1st  Points classification
1st Stage 3
 1st Trofeo Pollença – Port d'Andratx
 2nd La Flèche Wallonne
 2nd Strade Bianche
 2nd Coppa Ugo Agostoni
 2nd Trofeo Serra de Tramuntana
 3rd Tre Valli Varesine
 4th Overall Route d'Occitanie
 4th Giro dell'Emilia
 5th Overall Volta a la Comunitat Valenciana
 6th Giro di Lombardia
 6th Trofeo Calvià
 7th Liège–Bastogne–Liège
 9th Circuito de Getxo
  Combativity award Stage 20 Vuelta a España

General classification results timeline

Classics results timeline

Major championships timeline

Awards and honours
In 2018, Valverde was the recipient of the Vélo d'Or. He had previously been runner-up to Paolo Bettini in 2006, and third in 2014.

Following his gold medal in the 2018 UCI World Road Race Championships, a section of the N-340 road in Murcia was renamed Avenida Alejandro Valverde.

References

Valverde